2013 Nantou earthquake may refer to:
 March 2013 Nantou earthquake, which occurred on 27 March 2013, killing one person
 June 2013 Nantou earthquake, which occurred on 2 June 2013, killing four people

See also
List of earthquakes in 2013
List of earthquakes in Taiwan